Ron Polonsky (born 28 March 2001) is an Israeli swimmer. He competed in the 2020 Summer Olympics.

His younger sister Lea Polonsky is a swimmer as well.

References

External links
 
 
 Ron Polonsky at Stanford Cardinal

2001 births
Living people
Swimmers at the 2020 Summer Olympics
Israeli male swimmers
Olympic swimmers of Israel
Stanford Cardinal men's swimmers